Cunningbird is an album led by trombonist Jimmy Knepper recorded in 1976 and released on the Danish SteepleChase label.

Reception

In his review for AllMusic, Scott Yanow said "Trombonist Jimmy Knepper, who had not had the opportunity to lead his own record session in 19 years, is in top form during this quintet outing with tenor saxophonist Al Cohn ... Knepper contributed all six compositions, which include a couple of haunting ballads, a blues, and a few songs based on the chord changes of standards. However, it is for the excellent solo work of Knepper and Cohn that this hard bop release is most highly recommended".

Track listing
All compositions by Jimmy Knepper.
 "Figment Fragment" – 7:41
 "Languid" – 5:34
 "Just Tonight" – 8:25
 "Noche Triste" [take 1] – 8:07 Bonus track on CD reissue
 "Spotlight Girl" [take 2] – 6:43 Bonus track on CD reissue
 "Cunningbird" – 6:33
 "Noche Triste" – 7:33
 "Spotlight Girl" – 7:44

Personnel
Jimmy Knepper – trombone
Al Cohn – tenor saxophone
Roland Hanna – piano
George Mraz – bass 
Dannie Richmond – drums

References

1977 albums
Jimmy Knepper albums
SteepleChase Records albums